Héctor Mauricio Morales Bettancourt (born 1 April 1980) is a Chilean actor. He appeared in more than twenty films since 2004. Morales is best known for his performance as Goyo in the 2008 film Tony Manero

References

External links 

1982 births
Living people
Chilean male film actors
University of Chile alumni